Saint Stephen Church is a church in Alfama district of Lisbon, Portugal. It is classified as a National Monument.

History 
The Santo Estêvão Church of the 12th century was reconstructed in 1733 in Baroque style by the architect Manuel da Costa Negreiros. After being damaged by 1755 Lisbon earthquake, the church was renovated, and reopened to cult in 1773. It was classified as National Monument in 1918 according to the Decree № 5 046.

Overview 
The church is in rectangular shape. Its facade is divided into 3 parts by pilasters. The central one was crowned by a triangular pediment, surmounted with a cross and framed with 2 towers. One of the towers was destroyed as the result of the earthquake. Interior part of the Church is composed of main altar with a stone altarpiece, a group of sculptures carved by Jose de Almeida, side altars, statuary, and the tiles of old sacristy.

See also 
 List of churches in Portugal
 List of National Monuments of Portugal

References

External links 

Roman Catholic churches in Lisbon
National monuments in Lisbon District